"Starboy"  is a song by Canadian singer the Weeknd from his third studio album of the same name. It features French electronic duo Daft Punk. The artists co-wrote and co-produced the song alongside Doc McKinney and Henry "Cirkut" Walter, with Jason "DaHeala" Quenneville providing additional writing. It was released as the first single from the album on September 21, 2016, by XO and Republic Records. It is an R&B and electropop song with lyrics that contain themes of extravagance of a celebrity life.

"Starboy" topped the charts in countries such as Canada, France, Netherlands, New Zealand and Sweden, as well as the US Billboard Hot 100, where it became the Weeknd's third chart-topper, and Daft Punk's first and only chart-topper. The music video for the song was directed by frequent collaborator Grant Singer, who directed the Weeknd's previous music videos for his previous chart-toppers "Can't Feel My Face" and "The Hills". In the music video, the Weeknd is shown trying to destroy evidence of his previous self, including his own awards from his past album, Beauty Behind the Madness. The video has been described as the Weeknd's attempt to murder his former personality.

Background and lyrics
On August 24, 2016, during a Billboard interview, Republic Records executive vice president Wendy Goldstein mentioned that the Weeknd had been collaborating with Daft Punk. The Weeknd later elaborated that he contacted the duo through mutual friends in the Canadian music scene, and that he was invited to a studio in Paris, France to work with Daft Punk. During his session recording the song "I Feel It Coming", the Weeknd could hear a separate track leaking into the studio booth from the control room. He discovered that the track was a beat that Guy-Manuel de Homem-Christo had been playing from a personal device. Inspired by the sound, the Weeknd immediately wrote material for it, forming the basis of "Starboy". Producers Cirkut and Doc McKinney then continued work on the track.

"Starboy" is an R&B and electropop  song that incorporates themes of the extravagance associated with a celebrity lifestyle and also discusses how the celebrity lifestyle can make an entertainer fragile. It was released on September 21, 2016, following the announcement of the album and its accompanying artwork the same day.

Commercial performance
The song reached number one in Canada, Denmark, France, New Zealand, Norway, Mexico, Sweden, and the United States, while also going top five in various countries, including reaching number two in both Australia and Ireland and number three in Germany. The single debuted at number 40 on the Billboard Hot 100, opening at number 22 on the Digital Songs chart with 28,000 downloads with only one day of charting and at number 37 on the Radio Songs chart with 36 million of audience, following its first full week of airplay. It became the Weeknd's third highest debut on the chart and Daft Punk's second top 40 entry. The following week, "Starboy" jumped 37 positions to reach number three, becoming the Weeknd's fifth top 10 single and Daft Punk's second. Additionally, "Starboy" made the biggest jump into the Hot 100's top five since Taylor Swift's "Bad Blood" leapt from number 53 to number one in June 2015. It sold 88,000 copies in its second week, and 92,000 in its third week.

After remaining in the number two spot for eight non-consecutive weeks on the Billboard Hot 100—behind The Chainsmokers' "Closer" for five weeks and Rae Sremmurd's "Black Beatles" for an additional three weeks—"Starboy" reached the top of the chart on the week of January 7, 2017, becoming The Weeknd's third and Daft Punk's first number one on the Hot 100. "Starboy" additionally topped the US Hot R&B/Hip-Hop Songs chart, where it became the Weeknd's fourth number one single and Daft Punk's first. On April 5, 2022, the song was certified 11× Platinum by the RIAA, denoting sales of 11 million units.

In New Zealand, the single debuted at number five, which was followed by two consecutive weeks at number 2 before moving to number one on the chart for the week of October 24, 2016. This marks the Weeknd's second number one single, as well as Daft Punk's first number one single in the country. In the UK, the single entered at number 3 for the week of October 6, 2016. The following week, it climbed up to number 2, held off by James Arthur's "Say You Won't Let Go". The next week, it was pushed to number 3 by "Closer" by The Chainsmokers before spending four weeks at number 4. Three weeks later, it flew from number 8 to number 3, due to the release of the album. That week, it also managed to reach a new peak of number 2 on the UK Streaming Chart (originally it had only peaked at number 3). It spent two weeks at number 3 before falling again, ultimately spending 15 consecutive weeks in the top ten.

Music video

Background and development

The music video for the song was directed by frequent collaborator Grant Singer, who directed the Weeknd's previous music videos for "Can't Feel My Face" and "The Hills". It was released through the singer's official Vevo account on September 28, 2016, on YouTube, along with an accompanying poster which Rolling Stone described as "pulp-horror-inspired". The video has been described as the singer's attempt to kill his former/old persona, perhaps signaling he is reinventing himself with this new album, by suffocating himself, clipping his old hairstyle, and crushing his glass-framed platinum records.

Several cars owned by the Weeknd are mentioned in the song's lyrics and featured in the video, including the Lamborghini Aventador SV Roadster which he sings in his second verse: "Pull off in that Roadster SV/ Pockets overweight, getting hefty," a Bentley Mulsanne: "The competition, I don't wanna listen/ I'm in the blue Mulsanne bumping New Edition," and the McLaren P1: "I'm trying to put you in the worst mood/ P1 cleaner than your church shoes". Billboard approached John Paolo Canton, McLaren Automotive's director of public relations, in order to find out the owner of the car, as their website stated "Even the world's biggest carmaker couldn't afford product placement like this, let alone a boutique British brand". Canton later confirmed that the car did belong to the Weeknd.

In 3 weeks, the video had 100 million views. The video had 500 million views in 3 months. As of February 2022, the video has over 2 billion views on YouTube, taking it into the top 70 most viewed YouTube videos, Outviewing another of the Weeknd's US number one hits, "The Hills", which is his second video above the 1 billion view milestone.

Synopsis
In the video, a man in a black ski mask and diamond-encrusted cross is sitting across from the Weeknd, who is zip tied to the chair. The figure then kills the Weeknd by asphyxiating him with a plastic bag. The figure is revealed to be the Starboy incarnation of the Weeknd—his other self represented his Beauty Behind the Madness era. He then walks through a house full of awards that he's received, as well as a portrait of Daft Punk, who collaborated on the song, and a panther. He comes upon a large glowing pink neon cross, which he grabs and uses to destroy various evidence and history of his older self, including numerous trophies, posters and a crystal chandelier, before setting fire to the closet, eventually destroying the entire house later. Walking through the garage, he passes several luxury automobiles, deciding on a McLaren P1 and drives off with a cat in the passenger seat, which transforms into a panther, as he rides off on Mulholland Drive. The video features product placement from clothing company PUMA.

The house where the video was filmed has been featured in commercials for Samsung, Microsoft, Range Rover, and Mercedes-Benz.

Reception and accolades
Kat Bein of Billboard commented that the music video is "equally moody". A writer from Slate magazine drew comparison of the video to Michael Jackson's "Black or White" video, which he has been compared to frequently for his musical style. The bleak focus on celebrity and transformation, as well as the morphing of the cat into a black panther, were some of the aesthetics that resembles Jackson's video.

Billboard ranked "Starboy" at number four on their "100 Best R&B Songs of 2016" list: "Centric pop with frayed edges has been the M.O. for The Weeknd ever since he first signed on to the Fifty Shades of Grey soundtrack, and "Starboy" proves the culmination and likely end of that formula. With Daft Punk in tow to provide sighing background vocals and occasionally drift the song's production dangerously close to out of frame, the spellbinding night-drive assumes Abel Tesfaye's new alternate identity with the confidence of a star big enough to dictate his own nicknames: Even the opening lines ("I'm tryna put you in the worst mood, ah / P1 cleaner than your church shoes, ah") barely bother setting the scene, since you remember where the movie last left off. "Starboy" might not have been titled to serve as a Ziggy Stardust tribute, but it reflects how, like Bowie, Tesfaye understands the importance of constant evolution in both his music and his image. When he shows up in a white suit doing K-Ci & JoJo covers on his next album, try to act surprised". In the annual Village Voice'''s Pazz & Jop mass critics poll of the year's best in music in 2016, "Starboy" was ranked at number 29, tied with Rihanna's "Kiss It Better" and Maren Morris' "My Church".

The video was nominated for Best Video at the 2016 MTV Europe Music Awards a day before its release, leading many observers to wonder whether it was included based on merit, or instead as a result of the singer's popularity on the channel.

 Use in media 
The song was featured in the 17th season of the popular FOX animated sitcom American Dad!''.

Track listing

Charts

Weekly charts

Year-end charts

Decade-end charts

Certifications

Release history

See also
 List of best-selling singles in Australia
 List of Billboard Hot 100 number-one singles of 2017

References

External links

2016 songs
2016 singles
The Weeknd songs
Daft Punk songs
Billboard Hot 100 number-one singles
Canadian Hot 100 number-one singles
Dutch Top 40 number-one singles
Number-one singles in Denmark
SNEP Top Singles number-one singles
Number-one singles in Greece
Number-one singles in Israel
Number-one singles in Norway
Number-one singles in Portugal
Number-one singles in Sweden
Songs involved in royalties controversies
Song recordings produced by Cirkut (record producer)
Song recordings produced by Daft Punk
Song recordings produced by the Weeknd
Songs written by Cirkut (record producer)
Songs written by Doc McKinney
Songs written by Guy-Manuel de Homem-Christo
Songs written by DaHeala
Songs written by Thomas Bangalter
Songs written by the Weeknd
Republic Records singles
XO (record label) singles
Contemporary R&B songs
Electropop songs
Songs about fame